Phyllodactylus paralepis is a species of gecko. It is endemic to Honduras.

References

Phyllodactylus
Reptiles described in 2013
Taxa named by Stephen Blair Hedges